The Ted Noffs Foundation is a charitable organisation located in Randwick, New South Wales, Australia. Founded as the Wayside Foundation in 1971 in Sydney by the Reverend Ted Noffs and his wife, Margaret, it now provides significant drug and alcohol services for young people in Australia.

It is specialized for a broad range of initiatives, including two residential treatment centres for adolescents with drug and alcohol problems, adolescent life management, continuing care, family and adolescent counselling, Indigenous Australians-specific counselling, an early intervention/educational project, and a number of social enterprises including "op shops".

History
The organisation was born out of its predecessor, The Wayside Foundation, which was established by the Reverend Ted Noffs in 1971 and renamed The Ted Noffs Foundation in 1992 to recognise the work of its founder. As early as 1969 Noffs had written, 'To the traditional hazards that adolescents have to face … separation from the family unit, finding a job, seeking a new area of accommodation, finding meaning and purpose in life, there must be added the new one of overcoming the trauma of exposure to drugs.' Since that time the organisation has expanded considerably, establishing a leading role in drug and alcohol services in Australia.

The 1960s 
In 1964, Reverend Noffs, together with his wife Margaret, opened the Wayside Chapel in Kings Cross at a time when the area was fast becoming a magnet for disaffected youth, the home of the red light district, illegal gambling and drug culture. At that time, it was only a single room with a dozen chairs in a block of flats at 29 Hughes Street, Potts Point. Within a few years of his arrival, Noffs had transformed it into a chapel, coffee shop, drop-in and community resource centre. It was the first office of the Foundation for Aboriginal Affairs in 1964.

The Wayside Chapel began confronting the social issues that beset the area. A crisis centre opened in 1965 to deal with the growing number of suicide attempts, drug addicts and overdoses occurring in the Cross. This was followed in 1967 by a Drug Referral Centre, the first in Australia.

More conventional church activities such as weddings and Sunday services were also carried out and the Wayside Chapel became one of the most popular wedding venues in Sydney. By the end of the decade, it had already cemented its place in the fabric of Sydney society.

The 1970s 
The growing drug culture of the 1970s and the devastation it caused to people on and around the streets of Kings Cross created deep concern for those working at the coalface of humanity. Action came before preaching at The Wayside Chapel and engagement with the community was more important than going to church on Sunday. Determined to do something, Ted and his team expanded programs to increase crisis support and reach out to homeless people and the many old, sick and disabled people living in poverty in the local area.

In 1971, Ted and Margaret Noffs founded the Wayside Foundation, a charitable organisation dedicated to providing a range of prevention and treatment services to the most vulnerable in society including drug-affected young people.

As demand for support grew, so did Wayside. The flat next door to 29 Hughes Street was acquired and services were expanded. Seeing a need to help children understand the risks of drug taking, Ted and his wife Margaret developed the Life Education Centre in the late 1970s to educate young people about health issues and making good life choices including the risks of drug use. The first class was held at Wayside and was well received.

Ted and Margaret had by now at Wayside, pioneered a number of far-reaching and innovative developments in social welfare.

The 1980s 
Thousands of weddings and naming ceremonies were conducted by Ted at Wayside, across Sydney and interstate. The outreach work to the young people, disadvantaged, homeless and drug addicted residents of the Cross continued with the establishment of the Shepherd of the Streets program.

But as the decade continued the strain from Ted’s ever-increasing workload started to show. In 1987, he suffered a massive stroke and was unable to return to work. Wife Margaret and son Wesley assumed leadership roles and assured that Ted’s work and legacy would be maintained.

Despite Ted’s illness, the Wayside Chapel, with Margaret at the helm, continued to support people in need. The crisis centre was receiving some 2000 calls a month and thousands more visited the Chapel to find acceptance and judgment-free assistance.

The 1990s 
In 1990, Wesley Noffs and his wife Amanda took on leadership roles with the Wayside Foundation.

Both had come to believe that appropriate scientific research should assess the needs of any prevention or treatment program, be integral to the development of its structure and delivery and also evaluate its effectiveness and efficiency in both the short and long terms.

In 1992, the Wayside Foundation is renamed the Ted Noffs Foundation in honour of Ted’s life’s work. The Noffs family goes its separate way, leaving the church and the Wayside Chapel behind.

Following extensive research commissioned by the NSW Health Department, in 1995, Wesley and Amanda establish the Program for Adolescent Life Management (PALM) as Australia’s first residential drug treatment program for young people.

In 1996, a non-residential (outclients) program is established for young people with drug and/or alcohol related issues. This adds and evidence-based, early intervention component to the Ted Noffs Foundation’s suite of services.

Wesley Noffs was recognised for his pioneering work in the field of youth drug treatment by his appointment to the position of Chairman of the NSW Drug Offensive Council in 1994 and to the Australian National Council on Drugs in 1997.

Amanda Noffs created the first free legal aid service (ASK) for young people. She also served on the boards of many non-government organisations and was an Official Visitor to Juvenile Detention Centres in NSW. 

Sadly, in April 1995, Reverend Ted Noffs passed away after many years of debilitating illness.

2000s 
In 2000, a second residential treatment service was opened at Watson in the ACT. This provided much easier access to treatment for young people residing in Canberra and the NSW South Coast. Soon after, in 2002, an Adolescent Drug Withdrawal Unit (detoxification service) attached to the Watson facility was established.

Concerned that there was little support for young people who had completed their residential treatment and returned to the community, Noffs launched a continuing care program. Known as Continuing Adolescent Life Management (CALM), the service began in 2004 and provided up to five years of follow-up for former PALM residents.

In the mid-2000s, further out-client counselling services were commenced in Mt Druitt, Sydney and the ACT. These programs were open to any young person in the community in need of assistance with drug and alcohol or mental health issues.

Noffs continued its innovation in youth drug and alcohol treatment with the establishment of the first Street University in Liverpool, Sydney. Designed as an early intervention facility, it offered a range of creative, vocational and therapeutic programs that would engage difficult to reach young people and bring them into our services.

This “non-traditional” health setting provided counselling to the young people that delivered a significant decrease in drug use and crime and an increase in mental well-being.

2010s 
A second Street University was established at Mt Druitt providing much needed support to the thousands of disadvantaged young people in the Western Sydney region.

In 2014, the NSW Government awarded Noffs multi-purpose youth homelessness funding under the Going Home, Staying Home reforms. This enabled the development of the Noffs Youth Homelessness Service which meant that, for the first time, both crisis and supported accommodation could be provided to young homeless people or those at risk of becoming so. This service also delivers ongoing counselling and case management to the young people that it houses.

In the same year, the Queensland Department of Health funded Noffs to establish a further three Street Universities at Logan, Southport and Caboolture in South East Queensland.

Also in 2014, the Ted Noffs Foundation began advocating for pill testing at music festivals throughout the country as an essential harm reduction strategy. Many years of work came to fruition in April 2018, when Noffs, with the full backing of the ACT Government, led Australia’s first legal pill testing service at the Groovin the Moo music festival.

In 2014, Wesley and Amanda Noffs, after nearly thirty years of service, retired from their senior management roles within the Ted Noffs Foundation.

Services
The following are the programs run by the organization.

The Street University 
The Street Universities create safer communities by providing opportunities for disadvantaged young people. They are non-residential treatment centres based throughout NSW, ACT and QLD to help young people aged 12–25 who have drug, crime and mental health related issues. Each centre is unique and provides opportunities for young people to engage in workshops ranging from music to coding. Evidence-based counselling is offered to help young people reduce their drug use, involvement in crime and improve their mental health and wellbeing.

A recent study by UNSW of The Street University over a period of time showed that, not only did the program effectively engage at-risk young people, but also significantly reduced drug use and psychological distress and notably improved overall wellbeing.

PALM (Program for Adolescent Life Management). 

PALM is a residential treatment program for young people (aged 13–17) to address serious drug and alcohol related difficulties. Operating as a Therapeutic Community, the three month program provides a holistic, intensive, multi-disciplinary, residential treatment program staffed by professionals specifically trained in working through trauma, challenging behaviours and complex needs. The program offers counselling, family support, group work, vocational/ educational modules, living skills and recreational activities.

A recent ground-breaking study by UNSW found that PALM significantly reduced drug use, psychological distress, hospitalisations and involvement in crime, including violent crime.

CALM (Adolescent Continuing Care)

The CALM program offers a range of community-based therapeutic services including individual and family counselling, life skills development and educational and vocational programs. A key component of CALM is the use of “Facebook” to maintain open communication with clients and provide ongoing support as well as information and resources on health and lifestyle issues. CALM also serves as the aftercare module for clients who have participated in the PALM residential program.

There are two CALM locations, one in NSW (Randwick) and the other in ACT (Watson).

Noffs Youth Homelessness Service

Noffs partners with other organisations in the South Eastern Sydney and Sydney Districts to provide specialist homelessness services. These services mean that young people have access to the right support locally, when they need it and before they reach crisis point.

Noffs helps keep young people housed and provides targeted strategies for those exiting

Out of Home Care, and those with complex needs. YHS has a strong focus on responses for Aboriginal young people and is accessible to those from culturally and linguistically diverse backgrounds.

General Drug and Mental Health Counselling (Getting it Together Scheme)

All Ted Noffs Foundation facilities offer drug and alcohol and mental health counselling services to young people and their families.

First Australians Counselling (Getting it Together Scheme)

This First Australians-specific program operates in Western Sydney and provides an early intervention service, one-to-one counselling and facilitates small group workshops.

The program uses a range of practical and effective methods such as fishing, bushwalking, sports and swimming activities to engage and build trust with Indigenous young people.

It uses this therapeutic relationship as a basis for addressing issues they would normally be reluctant to discuss.

Homelessness Support (Take Hold) 
Take Hold has three components: mentoring, life skills and social enterprise. The attraction of volunteers to act as mentors is still showing strong expansion indicating the level of support from the Canberra community for the program.

Op Shops 
The Ted Noffs Foundation operates 10 Op Shops in Sydney, Australia. All funds raised from the shops are directed to frontline programs. These shops are staffed by over 200 volunteers who each year donate more than 18,000 work hours to support services for disadvantaged young Australians.

Partnerships
Ted Noffs Foundation partners with Caretakers Cottage, a South Eastern Sydney-based youth homelessness non-governmental organisation. The partnership commenced as a response to the New South Wales Government "Going Home Staying Home" reforms, first initiated under then Minister for Family and Community Services (FaCS), Pru Goward. Ted Noffs and Caretakers Cottage jointly tendered for a multi-purpose youth homelessness funding under the Going Home Staying Home reforms. The partnership allowed for the full implementation of the reform along with the elements of previous tenders. The partnership has enabled Ted Noffs to provide crisis accommodation with the added focus of drug & alcohol and lifestyle issues.

Chronology of the Organisation's Development
 1992- Title of organisation changed from Wayside Foundation to The Ted Noffs Foundation Inc., which then tends to be referred to more commonly as 'Ted Noffs' or simply 'Noffs'.
 1994- Ted Noffs and NDARC (National Drug and Alcohol Centre) obtain funding from the NSW Health Department to undertake a research project to determine best practicein adolescent drug treatment and to design a new treatment program to be implemented by The Ted Noffs Foundation Inc.

 1994- CEO Wesley Noffs is appointed chairman of the Drug Offensive Council of the NSW Health Department.
 1995- PALM (Sydney) opens, the first of the PALM (Program for Adolescent Life Management) residential treatment centres.
 1996- Noffs consults with key service providers to establish a non-residential (out clients) program for young people with substance abuse problems, in order to incorporate an evidence-based 'early intervention' component. Funding is negotiated with Morgan Banks for the first three years.
 1999- Noffs presents key findings of the non-residential 'out client' model at the NSW Drug Summit. Recommendations are made to implement the organisation's Schools Program along these parameters.
 2000- PALM West (Parramatta) opens.
 2000- PALM ACT opened by Governor General Sir William Deane in Watson.
 2001- PALM Coffs Harbour opened by the Minister of Juvenile Justice.
 2001- Launch of ASK!, a free legal advice service for youth, in partnership with the legal firm Mallesons Stephen Jaques.
 2002- ADWU (Adolescent Drug Withdrawal Unit) opened by Chief Minister in ACT.
 2002- PALM Dubbo begins operation, opened by Carmel Tebbutt.
 2002- Implementation of the Wollongong Schools Program, supported by BHP Billiton.
 2002- Implementation of the Western Sydney Schools Program, supported by the Telstra Foundation.
 2003- Launch of the Ted Noffs Institute, a specialised institute that delivers training and development to the AOD (alcohol and other drugs) and non-AOD sectors.
 2003- A mentoring program for PALM Dubbo residents, providing indigenous youth in Western NSW with positive role models and support to consolidate positive gains made at PALM Dubbo.
 2003- Implementation of the Central Coast Schools Program.
 2004- Newcastle Schools Program (NSW)is opened at TAFE campus.
 2004- Implementation of Continuing Care program for PALM East and West residents.
2017 - Wesley and Mandy Noffs retire from staff roles.
2017 - Wesley and Mandy Noffs nominated for Board membership.

References

Addiction organisations in Australia
Organizations established in 1992